Giba is a comune (municipality) in the province of South Sardinia, Sardinia, Italy.

Two state roads cross the territory of Giba, the SS195 "Sulcitana" and the SS293.

References

Cities and towns in Sardinia